George Derek Ibbotson  (17 June 1932 – 23 February 2017) was an English runner who excelled in athletics in the 1950s. His most famous achievement was setting a new world record in the mile in 1957.

Biography
Ibbotson was born in Huddersfield in the West Riding of Yorkshire, and studied at King James's Grammar School, Almondbury. He was of the generation that included other great British milers such as Roger Bannister, Chris Brasher and Christopher Chataway. He was the junior champion in Britain in 1951.

After service in the Royal Air Force, Ibbotson returned to competition. In 1956 at Melbourne, he won a bronze medal in the 5,000 metres. After the games, Ibbotson focused on the mile, which was probably an error. Ibbotson began the 1957 season running in mile races, as a 5,000m or 3 mile runner would often do in the early part of the racing season - to race at a faster pace than he would need in those longer distances. After he had run a particularly fast mile at a Glasgow meeting, an experienced athletics official told the BBC that while it was a very good time, he and many others felt that Ibbotson’s greater potential was over 5,000m or 3 miles.
In a race dubbed "mile of the century", Ibbotson won, probably because Delaney, the 1,500m champion at Melbourne the previous year, was boxed in at a crucial point on the final lap. The time was a new world record, taking 0.8 of a second off John Landy's time of 3.58 min set in 1954. Ibbotson continued competing in mile races throughout the season as well as some longer distance events - and ended the season exhausted. It was not just the number of races but the faster pace at which they were run.

Ibbotson never found the same form again. He represented England in the Empire Games at Cardiff in 1958, finishing tenth in the 3 miles. Ibbotson soldiered on and in 1960, in a bid to enter the Rome Olympics, he copied Gordon Pirie who, when he was struggling for form, increased his racing and took part in shorter races than usual, because it was good speed training. Ibbotson was not so successful and was not selected.
Ibbotson continued to compete for much of the 1960s. After a poor 1961 season, he found success on the Indoor circuit, becoming the 1962 European Indoor champion for  Two Miles (8:47.8).

He was one of many signatories in a letter to The Times on 17 July 1958 opposing 'the policy of apartheid' in international sport and defending 'the principle of racial equality which is embodied in the Declaration of the Olympic Games'.

In 2004 he received an honorary degree of Doctor of Civil Laws from the University of Hudersfield. 
He was appointed Member of the Order of the British Empire (MBE) in the 2008 New Year Honours for services to athletics. In 2011, he was inducted into the England Athletics Hall of Fame.

A qualified electrical engineer, he worked initially for the Coal Board but later was employed in sales, latterly as an agent for Puma, the sportswear company. Turning later to squash, he became good enough to represent Yorkshire, twice winning the Yorkshire veterans championship. He also played golf until he was in his 70s.

Ibbotson was married twice. His first wife, Madeline Wooller was an English cross country international runner. That union resulted in three daughters, Christine, Nicki and Georgina. After his divorce from Madeline, he married Ann Parmenter. A daughter, Joanna, was the product of that marriage. Ann died in 1997.

George Derek Ibbotson, born on 17 June 1932, died in Wakefield on 23 February 2017, aged 84. A large crowd attended his funeral service led by The Vicar of Huddersfield, the Rev Canon Simon Moor, at St Peter’s Church in Huddersfield, who said Derek Ibbotson epitomised all that was life-enhancing about sport and noted that "two of Derek’s proudest achievements were being awarded his MBE in 2008 and receiving an honorary degree from Huddersfield University."

References

 Brown, Geoff and Hogsbjerg, Christian. Apartheid is not a Game: Remembering the Stop the Seventy Tour campaign. London: Redwords, 2020. .

External links 
Derek Ibbotson's story of smashing the world record in 1957
The four stages in the life of the "Four Minute Smiler"

1932 births
2017 deaths
Sportspeople from Huddersfield
English male middle-distance runners
English male long-distance runners
Olympic athletes of Great Britain
Olympic bronze medallists for Great Britain
Athletes (track and field) at the 1956 Summer Olympics
Commonwealth Games competitors for England
Athletes (track and field) at the 1958 British Empire and Commonwealth Games
World record setters in athletics (track and field)
Members of the Order of the British Empire
People educated at King James's School, Almondbury
Medalists at the 1956 Summer Olympics
Olympic bronze medalists in athletics (track and field)
People associated with the University of Huddersfield